James Enojo Ocholi,  SAN (26 November 1960 – 6 March 2016) was a Nigerian politician who served as Minister of State for Labour and Productivity from November 2015 to March 2016. A lawyer by profession, he was granted the title of Senior Advocate of Nigeria in 2007. Ocholi, along with his wife, Blessing Ocholi and son died in a car accident on 6 March 2016.

References

1960 births
2016 deaths
All Progressives Congress politicians
Federal ministers of Nigeria
20th-century Nigerian lawyers
Senior Advocates of Nigeria
Road incident deaths in Nigeria
21st-century Nigerian lawyers